Stephen James Kopp (March 28, 1951 – December 17, 2014) was an American educator. He was president of Marshall University in Huntington, West Virginia from 2005 until his death in 2014. 

He earned a Bachelor of Science degree in biology from the University of Notre Dame, and his Ph.D. in Physiology and Biophysics from the University of Illinois at Chicago.

He served as a postdoctoral fellow at the St. Louis University Medical Center, and a research fellow and NIH Fellow in the department of biochemistry at the University of Illinois at Chicago prior to joining the faculty of Midwestern University.

Prior to his career at Marshall, Kopp had been serving as a Special Assistant to the Chancellor with the Ohio Board of Regents. Dr. Kopp served as Provost at Ohio University from 2002 to 2004 in Athens, Ohio. He also was founding Dean of the Herbert H. and Grace A. Dow College of Health Professions at Central Michigan University, and founding Dean of the College of Allied Health Professions at Midwestern University. He also served in a variety of positions for nearly 20 years at the Chicago College of Osteopathic Medicine.

Kopp assumed the presidency on July 1, 2005, taking over from interim president Michael J. Farrell. During that time, MU invested more than $300 million in new buildings and building renovations, including the new Visual Arts Center in downtown Huntington, the $55 million Arthur Weisberg Family Applied Engineering Complex, the $48 million Robert C. Byrd Biotechnology Science Center, the $23.5 million Erma Ora Byrd Clinical Center, the $44 million Edwards Comprehensive Cancer Center, the $17 million Chris Cline Athletic Complex indoor practice facility and the $8 million Veterans Memorial Soccer Complex. 

Marshall’s academic profile grew dramatically under Kopp with new high-demand majors and degree programs, including digital forensics and the new schools of pharmacy, physical therapy and public health. Facing declining undergraduate enrollment at the beginning of his term, Kopp went on a tour statewide of high schools throughout West Virginia and was able to help Marshall reach record highs for undergraduate enrollment. Under his leadership, the four-year undergraduate engineering program was re-established and is now fully accredited.  Also, external funding for research doubled and a $30 million research endowment has been established at Marshall, following the successful mini-campaign to raise $15 million in private gifts. President Kopp was the architect for the West Virginia Research Trust Fund legislation, which has matched dollar-for-dollar the private gifts to Marshall in support research.

He was also a key figure in guiding the Joan C. Edwards School of Medicine out of its LCME probationary period in 2011 to reaccreditation in 2013 along with Dean Joseph I. Shapiro, whom Kopp was very instrumental in recruiting to Marshall in 2012.

Kopp died suddenly on December 17, 2014, of an apparent heart attack.

References

External links
Official Marshall University biography
Curriculum Vitae of Stephen J. Kopp, PhD
Kopp Introduced as 36th Marshall President

1951 births
2014 deaths
Zonians
Presidents of Marshall University
University of Illinois Chicago alumni
University of Notre Dame alumni
Saint Louis University alumni
Ohio University faculty
Central Michigan University faculty